The inaugural Big East men's basketball tournament took place at the Providence Civic Center in Providence, Rhode Island, in March 1980.  It is a single-elimination tournament with three rounds.  Syracuse had the best regular season conference record and received the #1 seed and a bye into the semifinals.

Georgetown defeated Syracuse in the championship game 87–81.

Bracket

Awards
Most Valuable Player: Craig Shelton, Georgetown

All Tournament Team
 John Duren, Georgetown
 Eric Floyd, Georgetown
 Marty Headd, Syracuse
 Louis Orr, Syracuse
 David Russell, St. John's

References

 

Tournament
Big East men's basketball tournament
Basketball in Rhode Island
College sports in Rhode Island
Sports competitions in Rhode Island
Big East men's basketball tournament
Big East men's basketball tournament
History of Providence, Rhode Island